Carlotta Brianza (1867–1930) was an Italian prima ballerina, dancing with La Scala in Milan and later with the Mariinsky Theatre in Saint Petersburg.

Biography 

Born in Milan, Brianza studied at the ballet school of La Scala under Carlo Blasis. She went on to dance as the company's prima ballerina in Luigi Manzotti's Excelsior. She toured the United States with the ballet in 1883 and danced it in Saint Petersburg in 1887. Thanks to her popularity there, in 1889 she was hired by the Mariinsky Theatre where she danced with Enrico Cecchetti in Lev Ivanov's The Tulip of Haarlem in 1889. On 15 January 1890, she danced Aurora in the premiere of Marius Petipa's Sleeping Beauty. She continued her dancing career in Vienna, Italy, Paris and London before returning to Paris where she taught until she retired. In 1921, Sergei Diaghilev brought her out of retirement to dance (as the 'bad fairy', Carabosse) in The Sleeping Beauty.  She died in Paris in 1930.

Notable performances
Among Brianza's notable appearances are:

c. 1883: debut in Luigi Manzotti's Excelsior at La Scala, Milan
1883: one of five Star Premiere Danseuses in the Kiralfy Brothers Excelsior in New York
1887: as the Spirit of Light in Luigi Manzotti's Excelsior, Arcadia Theatre, Saint Petersburg
1890: as Aurora in The Sleeping Beauty 
1892: as Sylvia in Sylvia, Arcadia Theatre, St Petersburg
1895: Sylvia, La Scala
1896: Aurora in The Sleeping Beauty, staged by Giorgio Saracco, La Scala
1921: Carabosse in the Ballets Russes production of The Sleeping Beauty, London

See also
Women in dance

Further reading

References 

1867 births
19th-century Italian ballet dancers
Dancers from Milan
Prima ballerinas
1930 deaths
Italian ballerinas